Todd Franklin Dunwoody (born April 11, 1975) is an American former Major League Baseball player.

Dunwoody was chosen in the seventh round of the 1993 amateur draft by the Florida Marlins. Throughout his 13-year professional career, he played for the Florida Marlins, Kansas City Royals, Chicago Cubs, and Cleveland Indians. In 1995, Dunwoody was named a Midwest League All-Star, and was named one of baseball's top 100 prospects by Baseball America in 1997 and 1998. However, he could not master the strike zone and hit just .233 in the majors.

In 2006, Dunwoody served as hitting coach for the South Bend Silver Hawks in the Arizona Diamondbacks organization. In following years, he worked as a sales manager at the Mike Raisor Ford dealership in Lafayette, Indiana.

References

External links

1975 births
Living people
Major League Baseball center fielders
Baseball players from Indiana
Florida Marlins players
Kansas City Royals players
Chicago Cubs players
Cleveland Indians players
Buffalo Bisons (minor league) players
Charlotte Knights players